Manikpur is a village in Dharwad district of Karnataka, India.

Demographics
As of the 2011 Census of India there were 382 households in Benachi and a total population of 1,982 consisting of 1,041 males and 941 females. There were 267 children ages 0-6.

References

Villages in Dharwad district